Emiliano Giron (born January 5, 1972) is a Dominican former professional baseball pitcher. After playing in the minor league system of the Cincinnati Reds from 1994 to 1996, he played with the Duluth–Superior Dukes of the Northern League in 1997 and 1998. For the next three seasons, he played for the Lotte Giants of the Korea Baseball Organization (KBO). Following a stint with the St. Paul Saints, he returned to the KBO, playing for the Hanwha Eagles in 2003.

Career
Since 2004 he played with the team Chinatrust Whales from the Chinese Professional Baseball League, debuting with a six innings start win.

He returned to Taiwan for the 2005 season with the same team, winning the game were her team achieved their 400th league win.

He ended the season with a 9–4 record and a league second 1.83 ERA.

In 2006, he pitched in the Mexican League with Acereros de Monclova.

References

External links 

1972 births
Living people
Acereros de Monclova players
Charleston AlleyCats players
Chattanooga Lookouts players
Dominican Republic expatriate baseball players in South Korea
Dominican Republic expatriate baseball players in Taiwan
Dominican Republic expatriate baseball players in the United States
Duluth-Superior Dukes players
Estrellas Orientales players
Hanwha Eagles players
KBO League pitchers
Lotte Giants players
Mexican League baseball pitchers
Princeton Reds players
St. Paul Saints players
Winston-Salem Warthogs players